Whitefish Island is an island in the St. Marys River, just south of Sault Ste. Marie, in Ontario, Canada.

History
It was an ancestral fishing station to the Anishenabek of the Great Lakes region for over 2,000 years.  It was reserved for the use of Chief 
Nebenaigoching and his band in the Robinson Huron Treaty, 1850 with the British Crown. In 1895, it became part of the west side of the Sault Ste. Marie Canal.

After it was taken in a series of expropriations from 1902 to 1913 for railway purposes, it became a park in the Parks Canada national inventory. The island was designated a National Historic Site of Canada in 1981.

A land claim was filed in 1982 by the Batchewana Indian Band, of the Batchewana First Nation of Ojibways, for the  island. After years of unsuccessful negotiations, hereditary Chief Edward James Sayers Nebenaigoching occupied the island from 1989 until the claim was settled in 1992. $3.5 million dollars in damages were paid to the tribe, and the island was returned to Indian reserve status in 1997.

References

External links

 Indigenous and Northern Development Canada profile

River islands of Ontario
Landforms of Sault Ste. Marie, Ontario
National Historic Sites in Ontario
Ojibwe reserves in Ontario
Sault Ste. Marie